The sphenoidal spine (Latin: "spina angularis") is a downwardly directed process at the apex of the great wings of the sphenoid bone that serves as the origin of the sphenomandibular ligament.

Additional images

References

External links
  - "Schematic view of key landmarks of the infratemporal fossa."
 

Bones of the head and neck